Penelope Judith Millar (born 1957) is a New Zealand artist, who lives in Auckland, New Zealand and Berlin, Germany.

Education 
Millar received a BFA in 1980 and an MFA from Auckland University's Elam School of Fine Arts in 1983. As recipient of a Scholarship from the Italian Government in 1990, she spent a year in Turin, Italy, where she studied Italian arts of the 1960s and 1970s.

Paintings 
Millar is known for her abstract acrylic and oil paintings. While her works may recall Abstract Expressionist paintings, Millar does not consider her paintings as being 'gestural'. In an interview with Ocula in 2016, she said that,The word that always sets my teeth on edge is ‘gesture.’ Gesture seems like something that comes gushing out from deep inside you. That is not really what I am interested in. My work is much more about drawing; it is about looking and seeing, less about ‘expressing’. I’m using gesture only in the sense that a gesture can communicate something.

Awards and honours 
2011 Arts Board Arts Grant, Creative New Zealand
2002 Paramount Award, Wallace Art Awards, New Zealand
1994 Moet & Chandon Fellowship, Avize
1990 Italian Government Post-Graduate Scholarship, Accademia Albertina delle Belle Arti, Turin, Italy

Residencies 
2009 Creative New Zealand Visual Arts Residency in New York, International Studio & Curatorial Program (ISCP), New York City
2006 Inaugural winner of the McCahon House Residency, New Zealand

Exhibitions 

Millar has had numerous solo and group exhibitions in both New Zealand and Europe and found critical acclaim in the international press.

Selected Solo Exhibitions
 2005 I Will, Should, Can, Must, May, Would Like to Express, Auckland Art Gallery, Auckland
 2006 Something, Nothing, 64zero3, Christchurch
 2007 Keeping You You, Keeping Me Me, Lopdell House Gallery, Titirangi, West Auckland
 2008 Matt Black, Galerie Mark Müller, Zurich, Switzerland
 2009 Giraffe-Bottle-Gun, New Zealand Pavilion, Venice Biennale, Venice, Italy
 2015 The Model World, Te Uru Waitakere Contemporary Gallery

Her painterly style was described as "energetic and overwhelming", and Andrea Hilgenstock calls her paintings "spectacular".
Further references can be found in recent publications on New Zealand art.
 

Her works can be found in the collections of the Kunstmuseum St. Gallen, Dunedin Public Art Gallery the Auckland Art Gallery, the Museum of New Zealand Te Papa Tongarewa, Christchurch Art Gallery, and numerous private collections throughout Europe.

She represented New Zealand at the 53rd Venice Biennial in 2009. This project is recreated in miniature in the 2014 pop-up book Swell, created in collaboration with paper engineer Phillip Fickling and writer Trish Gribben – this book in turn inspired full-scale pop-up style works for her solo exhibition The Model World and large sculptures for SCAPE and the Auckland Art Gallery.

In 2011 she was again part of the Venice Biennale in the collateral event Personal Structures in Palazzo Bembo.

Current 

Millar is represented by Gow Langsford Gallery in Auckland, Gallery Mark Müller in Zurich, Hamish Morrison Gallery in Berlin, and Sullivan Strumpf, Sydney.

References

Further reading 
 Byrt, Anthony, "This Model World: Travels to the Edge of Contemporary Art", AUP, 2016 
 Gribben, Trish, Judy Millar and Phillip Fickling, "Swell", Te Uru Waitakere Contemporary Gallery, 2014 
 Emmerling, Leonhard, Judy Millar: You You, Me Me, Kerber Art, 2010 
 Emmerling, Leonhard, Judy Millar: Giraffe-Bottle-Gun, Kerber Art, 2010 
 Thomas, Morgan, Folding, Unfolding: Judy Millar’s Something Nothing, 64zero3, 2006
 Leonard, Robert Judy Millar: I will, should, can, must, may, would like to express, Auckland Art Gallery, 2005 
 Kaeppele, Susan, IS/NZ, Kehrer Heidelberg, 2005
 Byrt, Anthony, Sticky, Ramp, Press/Whitecliffe, 2004
 Lonie, Bridie, Child’s Play: Judy Millar’s I is She, As You to Me, Art New Zealand, August 2004
 Paton, Justin, I is She as You to Me, Dunedin Public Art Gallery, 2003

External links 
Kunstmuseum St. Gallen
Gow Langsford Gallery
Gallery Mark Müller
Hamish Morrison Galerie
St Paul St Gallery
New Zealand at Biennale de Venezia 2009
 

1957 births
Elam Art School alumni
Living people
New Zealand women artists
New Zealand contemporary artists
People educated at Westlake Girls High School